Kazlak (also Romanized as Kaz̄lak; also known as Gaznak) is a village in Kuhpayeh-e Sharqi Rural District, in the Central District of Abyek County, Qazvin Province, Iran. At the 2006 census, its population was 97, in 27 families.

References 

Populated places in Abyek County